Orkel AS is a Norwegian company that produces heavy machinery. Orkel is located in Orkland, in close vicinity to Trondheim. The company was established in 1949 by Johan Gjønnes. It is one of the largest industrial companies in the county of Sør-Trøndelag. Orkel is, together with Kverneland Group among the largest producers machinery in Norway.

The main product in the international market is the Compactor. Orkel exports the compactor to more than 40 countries.

The company is one of the biggest manufacturers in its segment in Norway

References

External links
 Orkel' homepage (corporate web site)

Manufacturing companies established in 1945
Construction equipment manufacturers of Norway
Companies based in Trøndelag
1945 establishments in Norway
Orkland